The College Heights Estates Historic District encompasses 170 contributing buildings in a mid-20th century automobile-centered residential suburban area of University Park, Maryland, and the neighboring unincorporated area of College Heights Estates in Prince George's County.  The earliest portions of the area were platted out in 1938, and the area was mostly built out between then and 1960.  The area features winding lanes and dead-end roads, with large houses on generously sized lots.  Houses built before the Second World War are predominantly Colonial Revival in character, while post-war construction includes a large number of ranch, split-entry, and Cape style houses, although they are generally larger than other similar houses built in other neighborhoods.  Also distinguishing the neighborhood from others are a significant number of architect-designed homes.

The district was listed on the National Register of Historic Places in 2012.

See also
National Register of Historic Places listings in Prince George's County, Maryland

References

External links
, including undated photo, at Maryland Historical Trust website

Historic districts in Prince George's County, Maryland
National Register of Historic Places in Prince George's County, Maryland
Houses on the National Register of Historic Places in Maryland
Colonial Revival architecture in Maryland
Tudor Revival architecture in Maryland
Houses in Prince George's County, Maryland
Historic districts on the National Register of Historic Places in Maryland